is the second album released by Japanese band Halcali.

The original jacket was redesigned and re-released to celebrate the album passing the 100,000 sales mark.

Track listing

CD
 Introduction
 
 
 
 
 Oboroge Copy View
 History
 
 
 Baby Blue!
 
 

2004 albums
Halcali albums